Shurab-e Olya (also Romanized as Shūrāb-e ‘Olyā; also known as Shūrāb and Shūrāb-e Bālā) is a village in Karizan Rural District, Nasrabad District, Torbat-e Jam County, Razavi Khorasan Province, Iran. At the 2006 census, its population was 99, in 25 families.

References 

Populated places in Torbat-e Jam County